George Holmes "Buddy" Tate (February 22, 1913 – February 10, 2001) was an American jazz saxophonist and clarinetist.

Biography
Tate was born in Sherman, Texas, United States, and first played the alto saxophone. According to the website All About Jazz, "Tate was performing in public as early as 1925 in a band called McCloud's Night Owls." Tate's 2001 New York Times obituary stated that "he began his career in the late 1920s, playing around the Southwest with bands led by Terrence Holder, Andy Kirk and Nat Towles."

Tate switched to tenor saxophone, making a name for himself in bands such as the one led by Andy Kirk. He joined Count Basie in 1939 and stayed with him until 1948. He had been selected by Basie after the death of Herschel Evans, which Tate stated he had predicted in a dream.

After his period with Basie ended, he worked with several other bands before he found success on his own, starting in 1953 in Harlem. His group worked at the Celebrity Club from 1953 to 1974. In the late 1970s, he co-led a band with Paul Quinichette and worked with Benny Goodman.

In 1979, Tate's hometown invited him to play a concert at Austin College's Sid Richardson Center as part of The Sherman Symphony Pops Series. Mayor Virginia Morriss issued a proclamation declaring October 6 "Buddy Tate Day". Accompanying Tate were Jay McShann, Claude Williams, Buster Smith and Paul Gunther.

In 1980, he was injured by scalding water in a hotel shower, which kept him inactive for four months. He later suffered from a serious illness. The 1990s saw him slow down, but he remained active playing with Lionel Hampton among others.

In 1992, Tate took part in the documentary, Texas Tenor: The Illinois Jacquet Story. In 1996, he recorded with reeds player James Carter on the younger man's second release for Atlantic Records, Conversin' with the Elders, along with trumpeters Harry "Sweets" Edison and Lester Bowie, and saxophonists Hamiet Bluiett and Larry Smith.

Tate lived in New York until 2001 when he moved to Phoenix, Arizona, to be cared for by his daughter. He died in Chandler, Arizona, twelve days before his 88th birthday.

Discography

As leader
 Jumpin' on the West Coast (Blue Lion, 1947)
 And His Celebrity Club Orchestra (Black & Blue, 1976) – recorded in 1954, some titles issued on the Baton label
 Swinging Like Tate (Felsted, 1958)
 The Madison Beat (Harmony, 1959)
 Tate's Date (Swingville, 1960)
 Tate-a-Tate (Swingville, 1960) with Clark Terry
 Buck & Buddy (Swingville, 1960) with Buck Clayton
 Groovin' with Buddy Tate (Swingville, 1961)
 Buck & Buddy Blow the Blues (Swingville, 1961) with Buck Clayton
 And His Celebrity Club Orchestra Vol. 2 (Black & Blue, 1968)
 Unbroken (MPS, 1970)
 Broadway (Black & Blue, 1972)
 Buddy Tate and His Buddies (Chiaroscuro, 1973)
 The Texas Twister (Master Jazz Recordings, 1975)
 Jive at Five (Storyville, 1975)
 Our Bag (Riff, 1975)
 Kansas City Joys (Sonet, 1976)
 Tate A Tete At La Fontaine - Buddy Tate Quartet & Quintet Featuring Tete Montoliu At La Fontaine, September 24 1975, Copenhagen (Storyville, 1976)
 Buddy Tate Meets Dollar Brand (Chiaroscuro, 1977) with Dollar Brand
 Live at Sandy's (Muse, 1978)
 Hard Blowin' (Muse, 1978)
 The Great Buddy Tate (Concord, 1981)
 The Ballad Artistry (Sackville, 1981)
 Just Jazz (Uptown Records, 1984) with Al Grey
 Just Friends (Muse, 1990 [1992]) with Nat Simkins and Houston Person

As sideman
With Ray Bryant
Madison Time (Columbia, 1960)
Dancing the Big Twist (Columbia, 1961)
With James Carter
Conversin' with the Elders  (Atlantic, 1996)
With Milt Buckner
Midnight Slows, Volume 1 (Black & Blue, 1973)
Midnight Slows, Volume 4 (Black & Blue, 1974)
Midnight Slows, Volume 5 (Black & Blue, 1974)
With Buck Clayton
Buck Meets Ruby (Vanguard, 1954) with Ruby Braff
Jumpin' at the Woodside (Columbia, 1955)
All the Cats Join In (Columbia 1956)
Songs for Swingers (Columbia, 1958)
Copenhagen Concert (SteepleChase, 1959 [1979])
One for Buck (Columbia, 1961)
With Arnett Cobb
Live at Sandy's! (Muse, 1978)
With Wild Bill Davis
Midnight Slows, Volume 2 (Black & Blue, 1973)
With Eddie "Lockjaw" Davis
Very Saxy (Prestige, 1959)
With Roy Eldridge
Rockin' Chair (Clef, 1951)
With Claude Hopkins
Yes Indeed! (Swingville, 1960) with Emmett Berry
Let's Jam (Swingville, 1961) with Joe Thomas
With Jay McShann
The Last of the Blue Devils (Atlantic, 1978)
With Jimmy Rushing
Livin' the Blues (BluesWay, 1968)
With Al Sears
Things Ain't What They Used to Be (Swingville, 1961) as part of the Prestige Swing Festival
With Rex Stewart
Henderson Homecoming (United Artists, 1959)
With Eddie "Cleanhead" Vinson
Live at Sandy's (Muse, 1978 [1981])
Hold It Right There! (Muse, 1978 [1984])
With Dicky Wells
Bones for the King (Felsted, 1958)

References

External links 
 Handbook of Texas Online, s.v. "," 
 New York Times on a 1986 tribute to Buddy Tate
 Buddy Tate Interview NAMM Oral History Library (1995)
 "Sherman native Buddy Tate dead at 88" National African American Alumni Association, by Don Eldredge (Sherman Herald-Democrat)

1913 births
2001 deaths
American jazz clarinetists
American jazz tenor saxophonists
American male saxophonists
Bebop clarinetists
Bebop saxophonists
Big band saxophonists
Count Basie Orchestra members
Mainstream jazz clarinetists
Mainstream jazz saxophonists
People from Chandler, Arizona
People from Sherman, Texas
Swing clarinetists
Swing saxophonists
Candid Records artists
20th-century saxophonists
American male jazz musicians
Saints & Sinners (jazz band) members
Statesmen of Jazz members
Sackville Records artists
Reservoir Records artists
20th-century American male musicians
Chiaroscuro Records artists
Black & Blue Records artists
Sonet Records artists
Muse Records artists
Concord Records artists
Prestige Records artists
MPS Records artists